Illinois Gaming Board (IGB) is a gaming board in Illinois that controls the state's gaming industry. The Board controls a regulatory and tax collection for video gaming and riverboat casinos. The Board has a five members, selected by the Governor and approved by the Senate.

History 
In 1990 Illinois became the second state to legalize riverboat gambling by The Riverboat Gambling Act. The first riverboat casino was opened in September 1991 in Alton. As of 2020, ten casinos are working in Illinois.

In July 2009, The Video Gaming Act was ratified. It allowed up to five Video Gaming Terminals (VGTs) to operate in authorized Truck Stops, Retail Establishments, Fraternal and Veteran Companies. All terminals are monitored by a Central Communication System.

On June 28, 2019, the Illinois Gambling Act was signed by the Governor, J. B. Pritzker.

Board members 
 Charles Schmadeke
 Sergeant Member Ruben Ramirez, Jr
 Dionne R. Hayden
 Anthony Garcia
 Marcus Fruchter

References

External links 
 

State agencies of Illinois
State departments of commerce of the United States
State law enforcement agencies of Illinois
Gambling regulators in the United States
1990 establishments in Illinois